Avalonia was a microcontinent in the Paleozoic era. Crustal fragments of this former microcontinent underlie south-west Great Britain, southern Ireland, and the eastern coast of North America. It is the source of many of the older rocks of Western Europe, Atlantic Canada, and parts of the coastal United States. Avalonia is named for the Avalon Peninsula in Newfoundland.

Avalonia developed as a volcanic arc on the northern margin of Gondwana. It eventually rifted off, becoming a drifting microcontinent.  The Rheic Ocean formed behind it, and the Iapetus Ocean shrank in front. It collided with the continents Baltica, then Laurentia, and finally with Gondwana, ending up in the interior of Pangea. When Pangea broke up, Avalonia's remains were divided by the rift which became the Atlantic Ocean.

Extent 

When the term "Avalon" was first coined by Canadian geologist Harold Williams in 1964, he included only Precambrian rocks in eastern Newfoundland.  More than a decade later he extended the term to include all exotic rocks from Newfoundland down to Rhode Island.  Since the introduction of the term terrane in the 1980s, Avalonia has been referred to as "platform", "composite terrane", "superterrane", "East" and "West Avalonia", and "Avalon sensu lato".  "Avalonia" can thus refer exclusively to rocks in Newfoundland (Avalonia sensu stricto), an assembly of terranes, or a single tectonic unit.

Avalonia is the largest of the peri-Gondwanan terranes, a series of continental blocks that more or less simultaneously broke off the margins of the southern supercontinent Gondwana and therefore share an early Paleozoic marine fauna.  They were pulled northward and eventually collided to form the Appalachian, Caledonide, and Variscan orogens.  West Avalonia, in North America, stretches from New England to Atlantic Canada, and East Avalonia, in Europe, from southern Britain to Brabant.

Other Peri-Gondwanan terranes, sometimes called "Greater Avalonia", include Carolina in the Appalachian and the deep bedrock of Florida in North America, Oaxaquia and Yucatán in Mexico, and the Chortis Block in Central America.  The North American terranes of Ganderia and Carolinia are sometimes grouped with Avalonia because they were transferred together across the Iapetus Ocean.  Sometimes the Meguma terrane in Nova Scotia is also included.

The Avalonian part of Great Britain almost exactly coincides with England and Wales. Elsewhere in Europe, parts of Avalonia are found in the Ardennes of Belgium and north-eastern France, north Germany, north-western Poland, south-eastern Ireland,  and the south-western edge of the Iberian Peninsula.

Part of the British-Belgian section formed an island in the Carboniferous, affecting the disposition of coalfields; this is known by names such as the 'London-Brabant Island'. Its bulk had an effect on the geological structure between the Ardennes and the English Midlands by influencing the subsequent crustal folding resulting from the Variscan collision.

In Canada, Avalonia comprises the Avalon Peninsula of southeast Newfoundland, southern New Brunswick, part of Nova Scotia, and Prince Edward Island. In the United States, Avalonia consists of northern coastal Maine, all of Rhode Island, and other sections of coastal New England.

Development 

The basement of Avalonia is poorly known, but, based on isotopic analyses, proto-Avalonia most likely evolved together with Carolina about 800 Ma from volcanic arcs far offshore from the supercontinent Rodinia, most likely outboard continental terranes of more obvious West African affinities, such as Cadomia and Iberia. About 650 Ma the Avalonian belt collided with Gondwana.

Avalonia originally developed along the shores of Rodinia together with island arcs now found in the Arabian-Nubian Shield (900–700 Ma) and Tocantins in central Brazil (950–900 Ma) and the basement of Avalonia is most likely of the same age.

During the Precambrian-Cambrian transition, Avalonia was located in a cool-water environment and even underwent a glaciation.  The Moroccan Anti-Atlas range in West Gondwana was, in contrast, characterised by evaporites, evidence of desiccation, and had thrombolites.  Avalonia and Gondwana must therefore have been located far from each other during this period.  The two did, however, share a geological history from later in the early Cambrian until the mid-Orodovician.

Subduction evolved along the shores of Gondwana, which caused Avalonia to rift away and begin its northbound journey towards Baltica during late Cambrian and Early Ordovician.  The Rheic Ocean opened behind the Avalonian microcontinents.  This independent movement of Avalonia started from a latitude of about 60° South.

The eastern end of Avalonia collided with Baltica at 30°S, an event which closed the Tornquist Sea, during the Late Ordovician.  In Avalonia, folding, faulting, and volcanism followed – as evidenced in the Welsh Borderland and the Taconic deformation in Laurentia – some or all of which are related to the collision.  Plinian eruptions resulted from the subduction beneath Avalonia and produced thick layers of K-bentonite in southwestern Baltica, while the Millbrig eruptions occurred in Laurentia.  This Late Ordovician magmatism peaked between 457 and 449 Ma.

In the late Silurian and lower Devonian, the combined Baltica and Avalonia collided progressively, with Laurentia, beginning with the long extremity of Avalonia which is now attached to North America. The result of this was the formation of Euramerica. At the completion of this stage, the site of Britain was at 30°S and Nova Scotia at about 45°S. This collision is represented by the Caledonian folding or in North America as an early phase in the Acadian orogeny.

In the Carboniferous, the new continent and another terrane, Armorica which included Iberia, drifted in from Gondwana, trapping Avalonia between it and the continent so adding Iberia/Armorica to Euramerica. This was followed up by the arrival of Gondwana. The effects of these collisions are seen in Europe as the Variscan folding. In North America it shows as later phases of the Acadian orogeny. This was happening at around the Equator during the later Carboniferous, forming Pangaea with Avalonia near its centre but partially flooded by shallow sea.

In the Jurassic, Pangaea split into Laurasia and Gondwana, with Avalonia as part of Laurasia. In the Cretaceous, Laurasia broke up into North America and Eurasia with Avalonia split between them.

Iberia was later rotated away again as the African part of Gondwana strike-slipped past it. This last movement caused the Alpine orogeny including the raising of the Pyrenees during the Miocene and Pliocene. As a result of this, part of Avalonia is now to be found on each side of the Straits of Gibraltar.

See also
 Armorican terrane

References

Notes

Sources

External links 
 Map showing Avalonia in the Ordovician Period

Historical continents
Ordovician geology
Paleozoic Europe
Paleozoic North America
Geology of England
Geology of Nova Scotia
Geology of New Brunswick
Geology of Newfoundland and Labrador
Geology of Wales
Terranes
Ordovician England
Ordovician Nova Scotia
Ordovician New Brunswick
Ordovician Newfoundland and Labrador